Nancy Brown may refer to:

 Nancy Elizabeth Brown (born 1952), US Navy admiral
 Nancy Brown (Kansas politician) (1942–2020), American state legislator from Kansas
 Nancy Marie Brown (born 1960), American author
 "Nancy Brown (song)", a popular song performed by Marie Cahill in the 1902  musical The Wild Rose